Henri Eberhardt (27 November 1913 – 4 July 1976) was a French sprint canoeist who competed from the late 1930s to the late 1940s. Competing in two Summer Olympics, he won two medals with a silver (1936: Folding K-1 10000 m) and a bronze (1948: K-1 1000 m).

References

1913 births
1976 deaths
Canoeists at the 1936 Summer Olympics
Canoeists at the 1948 Summer Olympics
French male canoeists
Olympic canoeists of France
Olympic silver medalists for France
Olympic bronze medalists for France
Olympic medalists in canoeing
Medalists at the 1948 Summer Olympics
Medalists at the 1936 Summer Olympics